Albert Frank Mockridge (21 October 1903 – 27 March 1990) was an Australian rules footballer who played with Geelong in the Victorian Football League (VFL).

Mockridge came to Geelong from Chilwell and was used mostly as a defender during his league career.

He was a back pocket in the 1930 VFL Grand Final, which Geelong lost to Collingwood. In 1931 he made just five appearances in the home and away season but was picked for his second successive grand final, as a reserve. Geelong won by 20 points and Mockridge, despite remaining on the bench for the entire game, finished his career with a premiership.

References

External links
 
 

1903 births
1990 deaths
Australian rules footballers from Victoria (Australia)
Geelong Football Club players
Geelong Football Club Premiership players
Chilwell Football Club players
One-time VFL/AFL Premiership players